The Möller manuscript is a compilation of keyboard music made by Johann Christoph Bach (1671–1721), the eldest brother of Johann Sebastian Bach. It is named after its former owner, Johann Gottfried Möller (1774–1833).

Johann Christoph Bach took Johann Sebastian and his older brother Johann Jacob into his home after they got orphaned in 1695, and was Johann Sebastian's first keyboard teacher.

The knowledge of the early keyboard works of Johann Sebastian Bach has come to a considerable extent from this manuscript which is archived in the Staatsbibliothek in Berlin. It contains 12 pieces by the young Bach, written in the early years of the 18th century, as well as music by some of the most famous German composers of the time like Georg Böhm, Nicolaus Bruhns, Dietrich Buxtehude, Johann Adam Reinken and Friedrich Wilhelm Zachow. In addition there are transcriptions of orchestral music by, for example, the 17th century French master Jean-Baptiste Lully.

Johann Sebastian likely had a considerable influence on the way the collection was put together. Therefore the manuscript gives insight into the kind of music which he was interested in and influenced his composing.

Some of the pieces in the manuscript are not known from any other source, like the short 'Gigue belle' by Werner Fabricius. But also for some of Bach's own works the manuscript is the only source, and in some cases it is the only reliable source of pieces which are otherwise only extant in copies of a much later date.

External links 
https://imslp.org/wiki/M%C3%B6ller_Manuscript%2C_D-B_Mus.ms._40644_(Various)

https://www.worldcat.org/title/moller-manuscript-and-the-andreas-bach-book-2-keyboard-anthologies-from-the-circle-of-the-young-johann-sebastian-bach/oclc/180423934?referer=di&ht=edition

Compositions by Johann Sebastian Bach
Baroque music manuscript sources

Compositions for keyboard